Abudefduf margariteus, commonly known as the pearly sergeant, is a species of damselfish in the family Pomacentridae. It is native to the western Indian Ocean, where it is only known from Mauritius and Réunion. Adults of the species inhabit coastal reefs exposed to moderate wave action at a depth of 2 to 8 m (7 to 26 ft). It is known to be oviparous, with individuals forming distinct pairs during breeding and males guarding and aerating eggs. The species reaches 16 cm (6.3 inches) in standard length.

References 

Fish described in 1830
margariteus